Andrés Ariaudo (born March 20, 1989) is an Argentine former footballer who played for Independiente in Argentina and for San Luis Quillota of the Primera B Chilena.

References
 Profile at BDFA 
 

1989 births
Living people
Argentine expatriate footballers
Argentine footballers
Club Atlético Independiente footballers
San Luis de Quillota footballers
Expatriate footballers in Chile
Primera B de Chile players
Association football midfielders